The 2000–01 Mongolia Hockey League season was the tenth season of the Mongolia Hockey League. EU Ulaanbaatar won the championship by defeating Shariin Gol in the league final.

Regular season

Playoffs

Semifinals
EU Ulaanbaatar  - Darkhan 4–3, 9-2
Shariin Gol - Baltika Ulaanbaatar 6–2, 9-5

3rd place
Darkhan - Baltika Ulaanbaatar 5-4

Final
EU Ulaanbaatar - Shariin Gol 8-0

External links
Season on hockeyarchives.info

Mongolia
Mongolia Hockey League seasons
Mongolia